Kong Inc. is a software company that provides open-source platforms and cloud services for managing, monitoring, and scaling application programming interfaces (APIs) and microservices. Some of the products offered by Kong Inc. include: Kong Gateway, an open-source API gateway; Kong Enterprise, an API platform that is built on top of Kong Gateway; Kong Konnect, a service connectivity platform; Kuma, an open-source service mesh; Kong Mesh, an enterprise-grade service mesh that is built on top of Kuma; and Insomnia, an open-source API design and testing tool.

History 

The original product was first developed in 2009 in Milan, Italy and first incorporated in the US as Mashape, Inc. The original project was a mash-up (web application hybrid) platform used to aggregate different functions and UI elements from third-party products and services. While developing the product the team dealt with a number of APIs, which inspired the founders to create a unified hub to organize the growing market of APIs. In November 2010 Mashape appeared online as an Alpha product  and launched in private Beta in June 2011. The team raised the first funds in the US. In 2010, Mashape received its first angel funding and a further $1,500,000 in seed funding. Mashape then rejected some acquisition offers in 2011.

In 2015 Mashape launched an open source project called Kong, which later helped the company secure an $18 million in Series B funding.  Subsequently, with the intention of pivoting the company's focus to its new Kong business, Mashape sold API Marketplace to RapidAPI, and rebranded the company to Kong Inc.

In 2019, Kong acquired Insomnia, an open-source API testing platform.

Technology 
In 2015, Mashape released Kong, an open-source management layer for APIs and Microservices that is built on top of Nginx and Cassandra/PostgreSQL with the claim of improving performance and reliability. Kong is the main engine of Mashape's marketplace.

References

Application programming interfaces
Cloud platforms
Computing websites
Internet properties established in 2009
Online companies of the United States
Companies based in San Francisco
2009 establishments in California